"X-Ray" is the second single from Camouflage's fifth studio album, Spice Crackers, released in 1996.

The single contains three versions of the song: the Soft Single Mix, which is an edit of the album version; the Ronda Ray single mix, which adds extra instrumentation to the Soft Single Mix; and the Tranceformer remix, which is a different take on the song and is the main single and video mix.

Music video
The music video depicts the two band members promoting some sort of campaign which involves "X-Ray" glasses (portrayed by conventional 3D cinema glasses).

Track listings
CD single (Germany, 1996)
 "X-Ray" (Tranceformer single remix) - 3:38
 "X-Ray" (Soft single mix) - 3:55
 "X-Ray" (Ronda Ray single mix) - 3:45
 "In Search of Ray Milland" - 5:53

12" single (Germany, 1996)
 "X-Ray" (Tranceformer maxi mix) - 6:47
 "X-Ray" (Tranceformer single remix) - 3:38
 "X-Ray" (Ronda Ray single mix) - 3:45
 "X-Ray" (Soft single mix) - 3:55

Credits 
Art Direction, Photography By [Photo Through The Space Train Window] – Michel Moers 
Design – Atelier Albrecht 
Management – Bear Music Factory GmbH 
Photography By – Reiner Pfisterer 
Written-By – Heiko Maile, Marcus Meyn (tracks: 1 to 3)

References
Camouflage - X-Ray at Discogs
Camouflage > Diskografie > Singles > X-Ray

1996 singles
Camouflage (band) songs
1996 songs
RCA Records singles
Songs written by Heiko Maile